A sonatina (French: “sonatine”, German: “Sonatine") is a small sonata.  As a musical term, sonatina has no single strict definition; it is rather a title applied by the composer to a piece that is in basic sonata form, but is shorter and lighter in character, or technically more elementary, than a typical sonata. The term has been in use at least since the late baroque; there is a one-page, one-movement harpsichord piece by Handel called "Sonatina".  It is most often applied to solo keyboard works, but a number of composers have written sonatinas for violin and piano (see list under Violin sonata), for example the Sonatina in G major for Violin and Piano by Antonín Dvořák, and occasionally for other instruments, for example the Clarinet Sonatina by Malcolm Arnold.

Term 

The title "Sonatina" was used occasionally by J.S. Bach for short orchestral introductions to large vocal works, as in his cantata Gottes Zeit ist die allerbeste Zeit, BWV 106, a practice with precedent in the work of the earlier German composer Nicolaus Bruhns. This is the only sense in which Bach used the term sonatina, although he composed many chamber and solo sonatas for various instruments.

As with many musical terms, sonatina is used inconsistently.  The most common meaning is a short, easy sonata suitable for students, such as the piano sonatinas of Clementi.  However, by no means are all sonatinas technically undemanding, for example the virtuoso sonatinas of Busoni and Alkan, and the Sonatine of Ravel, whose title reflects its neo-classical quality. On the other hand, some sonatas could equally have been called sonatinas: for example Beethoven's Op. 49, titled by the composer "Zwei Leichte Sonaten für das Pianoforte" ("Two Easy Sonatas for Piano") comprise only two short movements each, a sonata-allegro and a short rondo (No. 1) or minuet (No. 2), all well within the grasp of the intermediate student.  However, other works titled "Sonatina", such as the Sonatina in F major, have been attributed to Beethoven.

Form 
In general, a sonatina will have one or more of the following characteristics: brevity; fewer movements than the four of the late classical sonata; technical simplicity; a lighter, less serious character; and (in post-romantic music) a neo-classical style or a reference to earlier music. Muzio Clementi's sonatinas op. 36 are very popular among students.

The first (or only) movement is generally in an abbreviated sonata form, with little or no development of the themes. For this reason, a sonatina is sometimes defined, especially in British usage, as a short piece in sonata form in which the development section is quite perfunctory or entirely absent:  the exposition is followed immediately by a brief bridge passage to modulate back to the home key for the recapitulation.  Subsequent movements (at most two) may be in any of the common forms, such as a minuet or scherzo, a slow theme-and-variations, or a rondo.

Composers

For solo piano 

Alexander Borodin
Alexander Goedicke
Alexandre Tansman
Anton Diabelli
Aram Khachaturian (1959)
Béla BartókSonatina (1915)
Ludwig van BeethovenSonatina in F major (attributed)
 Ludwig van BeethovenSonatina in G major (Anh.5 No.2, attributed). 
Camargo Guarnieri
Charles-Valentin AlkanSonatina in A minor, Op.61 (1861)
Carl Czerny
Carl Philipp Emanuel Bach
Charles Koechlin
Erik Satie
Ferruccio Busoni
Francisco Mignone
Frank Lynes
Franz Joseph Haydn
Friedrich Kuhlau
Fritz Spindler
Geghuni Chitchian — Sonatina (1987)
George Frideric Handel
Heinrich Lichner

Ignaz Pleyel
Jan Ladislav Dussek
Jean Sibelius
John IrelandSonatina (1926–27) 
Lars-Erik Larsson — Sonatina No. 1, Op. 16 (1938)
Lars-Erik Larsson — Sonatina No. 2
Lars-Erik Larsson — Sonatina No. 3, Op. 41 (1950)
Maurice Ravel (1905)
Mikis Theodorakis – Sonatina 
Muzio Clementi
Osvaldo Lacerda
Stephen Heller
Swan Hennessy (Op. 43, 1911)
Tigran Mansurian — Sonatina No. 1 (1963)
Tigran Mansurian — Sonatina No. 2 (1987)
Wolfgang Amadeus Mozart – "Six Viennese Sonatinas" (1805)
Zdeněk Fibich

For instrumental duos 
 Antonín DvořákSonatina for violin and piano (1893)
 Bohuslav MartinůSonatina for clarinet and piano (1956)
Franz SchubertThree sonatinas for violin and piano, Op. posth. 137 (1816)
 Walter PistonSonatina for violin and harpsichord (1945)
Mikis Theodorakis – 2 Sonatinas for violin and piano

Other sonatinas 
 Pyotr Ilyich Tchaikovsky Serenade for Strings, 1st movement "Pezzo in forma di sonatina" (1880)

References

 Sonatina